Connie Booth (born 2 December 1940) is an American actress and writer. She has appeared in several British television programmes and films, including her role as Polly Sherman on BBC Two's Fawlty Towers, which she co-wrote with her then-husband John Cleese. In 1995 she quit acting and worked as a psychotherapist until her retirement.

Early life
Booth was born in Indianapolis, Indiana, on 2 December 1940.  Her father was a Wall Street stockbroker and her mother an actress.  The family later moved to New York State.  Booth entered acting and worked as a Broadway understudy and waitress.  She met John Cleese while he was working in New York City; they married on February 20, 1968.

Acting career
Booth secured parts in episodes of Monty Python's Flying Circus (1969–74) and in the Python films And Now for Something Completely Different (1971) and Monty Python and the Holy Grail (1975, as a woman accused of being a witch). She also appeared in How to Irritate People (1968), a pre-Monty Python film starring Cleese and other future Monty Python members; a short film titled Romance with a Double Bass (1974) which Cleese adapted from a short story by Anton Chekhov; and The Strange Case of the End of Civilization as We Know It (1977), Cleese's Sherlock Holmes spoof, as Mrs. Hudson.

Booth and Cleese co-wrote and co-starred in Fawlty Towers (1975 and 1979), in which she played waitress and chambermaid Polly. For thirty years Booth declined to talk about the show until she agreed to participate in a documentary about the series for the digital channel Gold in 2009.

Booth played various roles on British television, including Sophie in Dickens of London (1976), Mrs. Errol in a BBC adaptation of Little Lord Fauntleroy (1980) and Miss March in a dramatisation of Edith Wharton's The Buccaneers (1995). She also starred in the lead role of a drama called The Story of Ruth (1981), in which she played the role of the schizophrenic daughter of an abusive father, for which she received critical acclaim. In 1994, she played a supporting role in "The Culex Experiment", an episode of the children's science fiction TV series The Tomorrow People.

Booth also had a stage career, primarily in the London theatre, appearing in 10 productions from the mid-1970s through the mid-1990s, notably starring with Sir John Mills in the 1983–1984 West End production of Little Lies at Wyndham's Theatre.

Psychotherapy career
Booth ended her acting career in 1995. After studying for five years at the University of London, she began a career as a psychotherapist, registered with the British Psychoanalytic Council.

Personal life
In 1971, Booth and Cleese had a daughter, Cynthia, who appeared alongside her father in the films A Fish Called Wanda and Fierce Creatures. Booth and Cleese divorced in 1978. With Cleese, Booth wrote the scripts for and co-starred in both series of Fawlty Towers, although the two were actually divorced before the second series was finished and aired. Booth's daughter Cynthia married screenwriter Ed Solomon in 1995.

Booth married John Lahr, author and former New Yorker senior drama critic, in 2000. They live in north London.

Selected filmography and theatrical appearances

Television

Film

Theatre

Notes

References

External links

Connie Booth at the British Film Institute

BBC Comedy Guide entry

1940s births
Living people
Alumni of the Open University
American expatriates in England
American television actresses
American television writers
Actresses from Indianapolis
Actresses from New Rochelle, New York
American women television writers
American women comedians
Actresses from London
Monty Python
American psychotherapists
Screenwriters from New York (state)
20th-century American women scientists
21st-century American women scientists
20th-century American women writers
21st-century American women writers
20th-century American comedians
21st-century American comedians
20th-century American actresses
21st-century American actresses
Scientists from London
Scientists from New Rochelle, New York
Writers from London
Writers from New Rochelle, New York
Comedians from London
Comedians from New York (state)
Year of birth uncertain
Lahr family